Mediodactylus narynensis is a species of lizard in the family Gekkonidae. It is endemic to Kyrgyzstan.

References

Mediodactylus
Reptiles described in 1999